Sattappa Ramanatha Muthiah Chidambaram Chettiar was the eldest son of S. Rm. Muthiah Chettiar and the progenitor of the M. Ct. family. In 1897, he purchased the zamindari of Andipatti from the Madras government and became its zamindar.

References

Indian bankers
Indian merchants
Businesspeople from Chennai